SRCT may refer to 
Small blue round cell tumour, a cancerous cell.
Scottish Redundant Churches Trust, a church preservation society.